Ronaldo Carvalho (born 28 February 1979) is a Brazilian former professional tennis player.

Carvalho, a native of Goiás, reached a best singles world ranking of 362 and won two ITF Futures titles. In 2004, he represented Brazil in a Davis Cup tie against Peru in Brasília, losing his singles rubber to Ivan Miranda in five sets. He made the occasional appearance on the ATP Challenger Tour and was a doubles finalist at the Quito Challenger.

ATP Challenger/ITF Tour finals

Singles: 4 (2–2)

Doubles: 13 (3–10)

See also
List of Brazil Davis Cup team representatives

References

External links
 
 
 

1979 births
Living people
Brazilian male tennis players
Sportspeople from Goiás
21st-century Brazilian people